Burwell Creek is a creek in Floyd County, in the U.S. state of Georgia. It is a tributary to the Oostanaula River which it joins within the city of Rome.

Burwell Creek was named for Judge Burwell, who settled nearby.

See also
List of rivers of Georgia (U.S. state)

References

Rivers of Floyd County, Georgia
Rivers of Georgia (U.S. state)